Dighalia is an upazila of Khulna District in the Division of Khulna, Bangladesh.

Geography
It has 20,768 households and a total area of 77.16 km2.

Demographics
According to the 1991 Bangladesh census, Dighalia had a population of 107840. Males constitute 53% of the population, and females 47%. The population aged 18 or over was 56,104. Dighalia has an average literacy rate of 39.4% (7+ years), compared to the national average of 32.4%.

Administration
Dighalia Upazila is divided into Dighalia Municipality and six union parishads: Aranghata, Barakpur, Dighalia, Gazirhat, Jogipol, and Senhati. The union parishads are subdivided into 29 mauzas and 43 villages.

See also
Upazilas of Bangladesh
Districts of Bangladesh
Divisions of Bangladesh

References

Upazilas of Khulna District
Khulna Division